Michael Granville (born February 14, 1978) is a retired American 800 metres runner.  He is known for being the National High School record holder in the race.  Running for Bell Gardens High School he set the record of 1:46.45 in the trial round of the 1996 CIF California State Meet at Cerritos College in Norwalk, California.  He went on to win the state meet the following day, but after setting the record he claims he just "dogged it."  He had won the race two years earlier and was upset into second by Aaron Richburg, in a major surprise the year before.

Granville also held the indoor 800 metres record (broken by Josh Hoey in 2018) and set the class record at 800 metres at all four levels of high school;  1:51.03 as a freshman, 1:48.98 as a sophomore and 1:47.96 as a junior.  He is reputed to have run the race around 1:56 in 8th grade.  He also won the prestigious Arcadia Invitational multiple times.

Granville was trained by his father, on grass at nearby Bell Gardens Middle School, separate from the rest of his team.  His father felt training on grass "makes you work harder."

The 1:46.45 qualified Granville to run in the United States Olympic Trials, skipping his high school graduation, a few weeks later where he advanced to the quarter finals behind the previous High School record holder George Kersh.

After high school, Granville went to UCLA where his times did not improve.  He did, however, win two national championships as a member of the school's 1999 4x400 metres relay and distance medley relay teams. He retired from track in 2004.

Granville now serves as the head coach of the Palo Alto High School Track and Field team and Cross Country team in Palo Alto, California. He is also the owner of the G:Fit Bootcamp an outdoor training circuit that incorporates modalities like TRX, weights, battleropes, and jump ropes into a comprehensive training routine.

References

External links
 
 UCLA Bruins bio

1978 births
Living people
American male middle-distance runners
UCLA Bruins men's track and field athletes
Track and field athletes from California
People from Bell Gardens, California